Reynir F. Grétarsson (born 29 December 1972) is an Icelandic entrepreneur, philanthropist, Icelandic map collector and author of "About Mapping Iceland" Founder and former CEO and current Chairman of the Board of Creditinfo Group, a multinational credit bureau and risk management company. Reynir was selected entrepreneur of the year in Iceland in 2008.[14]

Early life 

Reynir was born in Blönduós in 1972 to father Grétar Guðmundsson and mother Ingunn Gísladóttir. After graduating from Menntaskólinn á Akureyri in 1992 he was admitted to the University of Iceland and became a law graduate in 1997, after which graduating with a master's degree in Law.

Career 

Reynir was a co-founder of Lánstraust hf., the predecessor of Creditinfo Group, in 1997. He co-founded a few other companies, with operations in IT and in real estate. He served as a board member for several companies. Reynir has participated in establishing and/or building up Credit Bureaus in approximately 30 countries. He was selected entrepreneur of the year in Iceland in 2008.

In 2018, Reynir co-funded two new companies, Two Birds (fintech) and Svartigaldur (online marketing).

Personal life 

Reynir has one son, Grétar, and two daughters, Salma Björk and Hildur Ösp. He lives in Reykjavik. Reynir graduated from the University of Iceland in 2014 with a BA degree in Anthropology. In 2013, he earned a diploma in International Development. Additionally, Reynir is a qualified lawyer with a Master of Laws(LL.M.) degree issued by the University of Iceland in 1997.

References 

1972 births
Reynir Gretarsson
Reynir Gretarsson
Living people
Reynir Gretarsson
Reynir Gretarsson
Reynir Gretarsson
Reynir Gretarsson